Kosmos 259 ( meaning Cosmos 259), also known as DS-U2-I No.3, was a Soviet satellite which was launched in 1968 as part of the Dnepropetrovsk Sputnik programme. It was a  spacecraft, which was built by the Yuzhnoye Design Bureau, and was used to study the effects on radio waves of passing through the ionosphere.

A Kosmos-2I 63SM carrier rocket was used to launch Kosmos 259 into low Earth orbit. The launch took place from Site 86/4 at Kapustin Yar. The launch occurred at 05:09:54 UTC on 14 December 1968, and resulted in the successful insertion of the satellite into orbit. Upon reaching orbit, the satellite was assigned its Kosmos designation, and received the International Designator 1968-113A. The North American Aerospace Defense Command assigned it the catalogue number 03612.

Kosmos 259 was the third and final DS-U2-I satellite to be launched. On 5 May 1969, it decayed from orbit and reentered the atmosphere.

See also

1968 in spaceflight

References

Spacecraft launched in 1968
Kosmos satellites
Dnepropetrovsk Sputnik program